This is a list of secondary highways in Sudbury District, most of which serve as logging roads or provide access to provincial parks and isolated areas in the Sudbury District of northeastern Ontario.

Highway 528

Highway 528A

Highway 535

Highway 539

Highway 553 

Secondary Highway 553, commonly referred to as Highway 553, is a provincially maintained highway in the Canadian province of Ontario. The highway is short, and spans only . Its only purpose is to connect the Highway 17, the Trans Canada Highway, in the community of Massey (township of Sables-Spanish Rivers) to logging areas and provincial parks north of the community.

At the northern terminus of Highway 553 at Bull Lake, the roadway continues as tertiary Highway 810. The route of Highway 810 was part of Highway 553 prior to 1976, but was downgraded to tertiary highway status in that year because of its more limited traffic usage.

Highway 607 

Secondary Highway 607, commonly referred to as Highway 607, is a provincially maintained highway in the Canadian province of Ontario, near French River Provincial Park. It links Highway 64 to Highway 69, and mainly serves as a bypass of the intersection of Highways 64 and 69. Its northern terminus is Highway 64, and its southern terminus is at Highway 69, near Bigwood.

Highway 607A 

Secondary Highway 607A, commonly referred to as Highway 607A, is a provincially maintained highway in the Canadian province of Ontario, in French River Provincial Park. The route connects Highway 607 to Bon Air and French River Provincial Park. The northern terminus of the highway is Highway 607, while the southern terminus is in French River Provincial Park, 0.5 kilometres past Bon Air.

Highway 637

Highway 661 

Secondary Highway661 commonly referred to as Highway661, is a provincially maintained secondary highway in the Sudbury District of the Canadian province of Ontario. It is a highway spur that measures  in length and connects the town of Gogama with Highway 144. It is the only provincial highway of any class that intersects Highway144 apart from its termini and the route of Highway 560. Highway was firsst assumed by the Department of Highways, predecessor to the modern Ministry of Transportation on January11, 1968.
It connected to the eastern terminus of Highway560. That route travelled south to Westree along the alignment of what is now Highway144, which was under construction at the time.

References